The 1912 United States presidential election in Louisiana took place on November 5, 1912, as part of the 1912 United States presidential election. State voters chose ten representatives, or electors, to the Electoral College, who voted for president and vice president.

Louisiana was won by Princeton University President Woodrow Wilson (D–Virginia), running with governor of Indiana Thomas R. Marshall, with 76.81% of the popular vote, against the 26th president of the United States Theodore Roosevelt (P–New York), running with governor of California Hiram Johnson, with 11.71% of the popular vote and the five-time candidate of the Socialist Party of America for President of the United States Eugene V. Debs (S–Indiana), running with the first Socialist mayor of a major city in the United States Emil Seidel, with 13.33% of the popular vote.

Louisiana was one of the states where the sitting president William Howard Taft came in fourth place.

Results

See also
 United States presidential elections in Louisiana

References

Louisiana
1912
1912 Louisiana elections